Theodore Peder "Ted" Mittet (born December 23, 1941) is an American rower who competed in the 1964 Summer Olympics.

Mittet was born in Seattle, Washington. In 1964 he was a crew member of the American boat which won the bronze medal in the coxless fours event.

References

1941 births
Living people
Rowers at the 1964 Summer Olympics
Olympic bronze medalists for the United States in rowing
American male rowers
Medalists at the 1964 Summer Olympics